Electronic Pleasure is the first full-length studio album released by British electronic music group N-Trance. It was released in November 1995 and the U.S. on 1996.

Critical reception
Music & Media wrote, "The album of this group, based around Kevin O' Toole and Dale Longworth, consists mostly of high-tempo techno, although some tracks have swingbeat, jungle, ragga and hip hop influences. Gimme 1 2 3 4 5 is one of those groovy mixtures, in which the rhythm around Ricardo Da Force' (KLF) and Jerome Stokes' rapping is much looser. I Don't Wanna Lose Your Love...Again is a touching ballad with warm sax solo." British magazine Music Week noted, "A mixes collection of dance styles, ranging from electro-pop to solid soul. It includes their two hits and a half dozen other tracks which could spin off as successful singles."

Track listing

Personnel
N-Trance
Kevin O'Toole and Dale Longworth: Producer
Ricardo da Force: Rap
Kelly Llorenna: Vocals
Jerome Stokes: Vocals
Gillian Wisdom: Vocals
Rachel McFarlane: Vocals
T-1K: Rap

Other musicians
David Grant & Choir: Backing Vocals
Snake Davis: Saxophone
Vinny Burns: Guitar
Bee Gees: Backing Track
Martin Ansell & Sandy McLelland: Vocals
Lee Limer: Dancin'

Engineers
Nobby: Engineer
Richie Rich: Assistant Engineer
Timothy Russell - Engineer
Adam Lesser - Engineer

Charts

Release history

References 

1995 debut albums
N-Trance albums
All Around the World Productions albums